Roger la Honte is an 1886 novel by the French writer Jules Mary. Its melodramatic plot takes place around the time of the Franco-Prussian War. It is his best known work. In 1887-1889 he published a sequel The Revenge of Roger la Honte which was released in two parts.

Robert Williams Buchanan produced a play derived from the work in 1888, retitled "Jean the Disgraced" and premiered at the Elephant and Castle Theater.

Adaptations
The novel has been turned into films on five separate occasions. 
 Roger la Honte (1913 film), a French silent film directed by Adrien Caillard
 Roger la Honte (1922 film), a French silent film directed by Jacques de Baroncelli 
 Roger la Honte (1933 film), a French film directed by Gaston Roudès 
 Roger la Honte (1946 film), a French film adaptation directed by André Cayatte
 Roger la Honte (1966 film), a French-Italian film directed by Riccardo Freda

References

Bibliography
 Goble, Alan. The Complete Index to Literary Sources in Film. Walter de Gruyter, 1999.

1886 French novels
Novels set in France
Novels by Jules Mary
French novels adapted into films